EP Aquarii is a semiregular variable star in the equatorial constellation of Aquarius.  At its peak brightness, visual magnitude 6.37, it might be faintly visible to the unaided eye under ideal observing conditions. A cool red giant on the  asymptotic giant branch (AGB), its visible light brightness varies by about 1/2 magnitude over a period of 55 days. EP Aquarii has a complex circumstellar envelope (CSE), which has been the subject of numerous studies.

The study of EP Aquarii's extended CSE began in 1984, when a spectral line arising from a rotational transition of carbon monoxide (CO) was detected by Zuckerman and Dyck, using the NRAO 12m telescope.  In the early 1990s, analysis of the IRAS satellite data showed the presence of an extended dust shell surrounding the star, with a radius of about 1 lightyear. In the late 1990s, high spectral-resolution observations at the Caltech Submillimeter Observatory (CSO) showed that EP Aquarii's CO line profiles had an unusual shape that suggested the presence of two distinct stellar winds, expanding at dramatically different velocities: 1.4 and 11 km/sec. In the early 2000s, observations of the 21 cm line of atomic hydrogen at the Nançay Radio Observatory confirmed the presence of a large circumstellar shell with multiple velocity components.

The completion of Atacama Large Millimeter Array allowed EP Aquarii to be studied with far higher sensitivity and angular resolution than was available to earlier researchers. The very narrow emission feature (indicating an expansion rate of 1.4 km/sec) seen in the CSO spectra was found to arise from a spiral structure, nearly face-on to our line of sight, which suggested the presence of an unseen companion star. The higher velocity wind arises from a bi-conical outflow, the pole of which is roughly aligned to our line of sight.

Which chemical compounds are found in the CSEs of AGB stars is largely determined by whether or not the stellar atmosphere contains more carbon than oxygen. EP Aquarii's atmosphere contains more oxygen than carbon.

References

M-type giants
Semiregular variable stars
Aquarius (constellation)
Durchmusterung objects
207076
107516
Aquarii, EP